Carsten Ball and Travis Rettenmaier were the defending champions; however, they competed in Wimbledon instead.
Ryler DeHeart and Pierre-Ludovic Duclos won in the final 7–6(4), 4–6, [10–8], against Rik de Voest and Somdev Devvarman.

Seeds

Main draw

Draw

References
Main Draw

Nielsen Pro Tennis Championship - Doubles
2010 Doubles
2010 in sports in Illinois